South Korean girl group Aespa has received numerous accolades, including three Korean Music Awards, four Melon Music Awards, four Golden Disc Awards, two MAMA Awards, and three Seoul Music Awards.


Awards and nominations

Other accolades

State and cultural honors

Listicles

Notes

References

Aespa